The RBC Bronwen Wallace Award for Emerging Writers is a Canadian literary award, presented annually by the Writers' Trust of Canada to a writer who has not yet published his or her first book. Formerly restricted to writers under age 35, the age limit was removed in 2021, with the prize now open to emerging writers regardless of age.

Named in memory of Bronwen Wallace, a Canadian writer who died of cancer in 1989, the award was created in 1994 by her literary executor Carolyn Smart to honour Wallace's work as a creative writing instructor and mentor to young writers. The Royal Bank of Canada stepped in as the award's corporate sponsor in 2012, through its Emerging Artists Project.

The prize has a monetary value of $10,000, with finalists receiving $2,500. The prize formerly alternated every other year between poetry and short fiction; in 2020 the Writers' Trust announced that they would present annual awards in both categories.

Winners
Note that at present, the Writers Trust's awards database does not provide the titles of winning or nominated works prior to 2008. Before that date, titles are provided below where known from other sources; from 2008 on, all titles are listed.

References

Writers' Trust of Canada awards
1994 establishments in Canada
Awards established in 1994
Literary awards honouring young writers
Literary awards honoring unpublished books or writers